Ronald Baensch (5 June 1939 – 28 December 2017) was an Australian racing cyclist, specialising in track sprinting events.  He represented Australia at the 1960 Olympics and several World Championships in the 1960s and in 1970.

Cycling career

1960 Olympic Games
Baensch competed in the 1,000 metre sprint at the 1960 Summer Olympics in Rome.  Losing to eventual gold medalist Sante Gaiardoni in the semi-final and to Valentino Gasparella in the final round race for bronze, Baensch finished in fourth place.

UCI Track Cycling World Championships
Baensch won a bronze medal in the men's amateur sprint at the 1961 World Championships in Zurich.  After turning professional in 1964, he won silver in the men's sprint at the 1964 World Championships in Paris,  bronze in the 1965 (San Sebastian) and silver again in 1966 (Frankfurt).

Baensch was fined ƒ 2,000 and disqualified from the 1967 World Championships in Amsterdam after testing positive to ephedrine.  He claimed to have taken the drug to combat a heavy cold.

Baensch was beaten by Angelo Damiano in the quarter finals at the 1970 World Championships in Leicester.

Later life
After his professional cycling career, Baensch was a truck driver in Europe and, on his return to Australia in 1974, he settled in Newcastle, New South Wales and worked on oil rigs.  He continued to compete in local cycle races in Australia until 1980, winning his last race. In 2011, Baensch was inducted into the Victorian Cycling Hall of Fame.

He died on 28 December 2017 at the age of 78.

References

External links

 June 2011 Making Waves newsletter - article about Baensch's induction into the Victorian Cycling Hall of Fame

1939 births
2017 deaths
Doping cases in cycling
Australian male cyclists
Australian sportspeople in doping cases
Cyclists at the 1960 Summer Olympics
Olympic cyclists of Australia
Cyclists from Melbourne